Anant Rao(Yadav) "A. R." Akela (born 30 September 1960) is an Indian author, poet, folk singer and publisher.

Publication
Akela owns the publishing business Anand Sahitya Sadan.

See also
Dalit literature
Lalai Singh Yadav

References

Living people
People from Aligarh district
Poets from Uttar Pradesh
Hindi-language writers
1960 births
20th-century Indian poets
Indian male folk singers
Singers from Uttar Pradesh